Castles in the air are daydreams or fantasies.

Castles in the Air may refer to:

 Castles in the Air (1919 film), an American film
 Castles in the Air (1923 film), a British film
 Castles in the Air (1939 film), an Italian film
 "Castles in the Air" (song), a 1970 song
 Castles in the Air (musical), a 1926 musical comedy

See also 
 Castle in the Air (disambiguation)